16974 Iphthime is a Jupiter trojan and a binary system from the Greek camp, approximately  in diameter. It was discovered on 18 November 1998, by astronomers with the Lincoln Near-Earth Asteroid Research at the ETS Test Site in Socorro, New Mexico. The dark Jovian asteroid belongs to the 80 largest Jupiter trojans and has a notably slow rotation of 78.9 hours. It was named after Iphthime from Greek mythology. The discovery of its companion by Hubble Space Telescope was announced in March 2016.

Orbit and classification 

Iphthime is a dark Jovian asteroid orbiting in the leading Greek camp at Jupiter's  Lagrangian point, 60° ahead of its orbit in a 1:1 resonance . It is also a non-family asteroid in the Jovian background population.

It orbits the Sun at a distance of 4.8–5.6 AU once every 11 years and 10 months (4,319 days; semi-major axis of 5.19 AU). Its orbit has an eccentricity of 0.07 and an inclination of 15° with respect to the ecliptic.

Naming 

This minor planet was named from Greek mythology after Iphthime, sister of Penelope and daughter of Icarius. Iphthime appears in her sister's dream to comfort her as she is grieving. The official naming citation was published by the Minor Planet Center on 3 December 2017.

Physical characteristics 

Iphthime is an assumed C-type asteroid. Its V–I color index of 0.96 is typical for D-type asteroids, the most common spectral type among the larger Jupiter trojans.

Rotation period 

In October 2009, a rotational lightcurve of Iphthime was obtained for the first time by Stefano Mottola from photometric observations during seven nights at the Calar Alto Observatory in Spain. Lightcurve analysis gave a long rotation period of  hours or 3.3 days with a brightness amplitude of 0.25 magnitude.

Diameter and albedo 

According to the surveys carried out by the Infrared Astronomical Satellite IRAS, the Japanese Akari satellite and the NEOWISE mission of NASA's Wide-field Infrared Survey Explorer, Iphthime measures between 55.43 and 57.341 kilometers in diameter and its surface has an albedo between 0.065 and 0.069. The Collaborative Asteroid Lightcurve Link adopts the results obtained by IRAS, that is an albedo of 0.0691 and a diameter of 55.43 kilometers based on an absolute magnitude of 9.8.

References

External links 
 (16974) Iphthime, Asteroids with Satellites Database, Johnston's Archive
 Lightcurve Database Query (LCDB), at www.minorplanet.info
 Dictionary of Minor Planet Names, Google books
 Discovery Circumstances: Numbered Minor Planets (15001)-(20000) – Minor Planet Center
 Asteroid 16974 Iphthime at the Small Bodies Data Ferret
 
 

016974
016974
Named minor planets
016974
19981118